The Curse of El Charro is a 2005 horror film starring Danny Trejo. The Curse of El Charro was released on DVD by Paramount Home Video in 2006.

Plot
The film opens in 19th century Mexico, where El Charro (Andrew Bryniarski) acts as a wealthy, but diabolical land baron who falls madly in love with a sweet, innocent ancestor of the protagonist Maria. She scorns him, which prompts El Charro to kill everyone she cares about. However, Maria's ancestor still refuses El Charro, who decides to put a curse on Maria's family line. Many years after, we are brought to the present day 21st century, where we are introduced to Maria (Drew Mia) and her friend Chris (Heidi Androl), who are roommates in college. It is a Friday or so, and Maria, who we learn is suffering from repeating nightmares of her sister's suicide, is coerced to go with Chris, and her friends, Tanya (Kathryn Taylor) and Rosemary (KellyDawn Malloy) to Chris' uncle's Arizona cottage for the weekend. However upon reaching Arizona, the group is persistently attacked by El Charro in the form of revenant spirit with a machete. Eventually, El Charro kills every one of the girls except for Maria, who races toward a shrine of the archangel Michael (James Intveld). Using his heavenly abilities, Michael kills El Charro, and the curse is thus destroyed as well.

Cast
 Andrew Bryniarski as "El Charro"
 Danny Trejo as voice of El Charro
 Drew Mia as Maria
 Kathryn Taylor as Tanya
 Heidi Androl as Christina
 KellyDawn Malloy as Rosemary
 Scott Greenall as himself
 James Intveld as Archangel Michael
 Gary Bullock as The Purgatory Bartender

References

External links
 
 

2005 horror films
Direct-to-video horror films
2005 direct-to-video films
American slasher films
2005 films
American exploitation films
American splatter films
American ghost films
American supernatural horror films
Supernatural slasher films
2000s English-language films
Films directed by Rich Ragsdale
2000s American films